Håkan Eriksson may refer to:

 Håkan Eriksson (orienteer)  (born 1961), Swedish orienteering competitor
 Håkan Eriksson (ice hockey) (born 1956), retired Swedish ice hockey player